Peter Mannos is a retired U.S. soccer goalkeeper who played two seasons in the North American Soccer League, one in the American Soccer League and one in 
Major Indoor Soccer League.  He was also a two-time first team All American goalkeeper.

Mannos attended Northern Illinois University, playing on the NIU Huskies men's soccer team from 1972 to 1975.  He was the 1974 and 1975 first team All American goalkeeper.  NIU inducted Mannos into the school’s Athletic Hall of Fame in 1985.  In 1976, he played six games for the San Antonio Thunder in the North American Soccer League.  He transferred to the Dallas Tornado in 1977, seeing time in three games.  In 1978, he began the season with the Tornado, but was released after playing no games.  He then signed with the Indianapolis Daredevils of the American Soccer League.  In the fall of 1978, he signed with the Pittsburgh Spirit of Major Indoor Soccer League.  After two seasons, he moved to the Buffalo Stallions where he played only one game before retiring.  In 2006, he was the director of marketing for Brooks Sports.

References

External links
 NASL/MISL stats

1954 births
Living people
All-American men's college soccer players
American soccer players
American Soccer League (1933–1983) players
Buffalo Stallions players
Columbus Magic players
Dallas Tornado players
Association football goalkeepers
Indianapolis Daredevils players
Major Indoor Soccer League (1978–1992) players
Northern Illinois Huskies men's soccer players
North American Soccer League (1968–1984) players
Pittsburgh Spirit players
San Antonio Thunder players
Soccer players from Chicago